David Lyon (Dave Lyon, born 1968) is a car designer best known for his work with General Motors where he worked directly from college in 1990 until 2012. He is originally from Naperville, Illinois, United States and has been moved around several General Motors design studios during his career. He is currently working for VinFast, a Vietnamese automobile manufacturer.

Career

Lyon studied at the College for Creative Studies in Detroit, Michigan where he received a bachelor of fine arts in transportation design in 1990. Directly after college he joined General Motors at the Design Center in General Motors Technical Center, Warren, Michigan where he was first assigned to the Oldsmobile design studios. In 1997, he joined the Cadillac design studio where he helped to design the first generation Cadillac CTS and in 1998 he moved to the Buick Brand Studio and served as Chief Designer.

In 2002, Lyon was appointed Director of Design for the three Truck Interior Studios in where he led teams working on all GM future production interiors, including the Cadillac Escalade, Chevrolet Tahoe/GMC Yukon, and Hummer H3. In 2004, Lyon was Executive Director of GM Asia Pacific Design where he led teams in Korea, China and Australia to develop the Chevrolet Cruze, Sonic and Spark.

In 2007, he relocated back to Michigan when he was appointed Executive Director Interior Design of North America. In that role, Lyon was responsible for 7 studios, including Perceptual Quality, Color & Trim, User Experience, and several Design Studios responsible for the design of Cadillac, Buick, GMC, and Chevrolet interiors.
In 2012, he was appointed head of GM Europe Design, the German base for Opel/Vauxhall design work but left GM with no notice end of July 2012.

After leaving GM, he established his own company David Lyon Design LLC.

In June 2013, Lyon started Pocketsquare Design, a studio focused on automotive interior user experience design.

In 2017, David became Director of Design for Vietnamese automobile manufacturer VinFast.

Significant designs

Oldsmobile Alero Alpha (concept car)
Oldsmobile Expression  (concept car)
Oldsmobile Alero
Buick LaCrosse (concept car)
Buick Bengal (concept car)
Cadillac CTS
Buick LaCrosse
Chevrolet WTCC (concept car)
Buick Riviera (concept car)
Chevrolet Cruze
Chevrolet Spark
Chevrolet Sonic
Chevrolet Volt
2009-2014 Cadillac Interiors
2009-2014 Buick Interiors
2009-2014 GMC Interiors
2009-2014 Chevrolet Interiors

References

External links
 

General Motors designers
1968 births
Living people
College for Creative Studies alumni
American automobile designers
People from Naperville, Illinois
Vingroup